Prasonisi ("leek island"), is a small islet off the southern coast of Crete, close to the northern coast of the island of Gavdos and between Gavdos and the islet of Gavdopoula, in the Libyan Sea. Administratively, it is located within the municipality of Gavdos, in Chania regional unit.

See also
List of islands of Greece

Landforms of Chania (regional unit)
Uninhabited islands of Crete
Islands of Greece